Mamadi Berthe (born 17 January 1983) is a Malian-French footballer. As of 2003, he plays for Club Sportif Sedan Ardennes.

Career
Berthe was part of the Mali U-20 team who finish third in group stage of 2003 FIFA World Youth Championship.

He was part of the Malian 2004 Olympic football team, who exited in the quarter finals, finishing top of group A, but losing to Italy in the next round.

External links 
  Career data from l'equipe.fr
  Career data from frenchleague.com

1983 births
Living people
Citizens of Mali through descent
Malian footballers
French footballers
French sportspeople of Malian descent
Sportspeople from Nogent-sur-Marne
Ligue 2 players
AS Cannes players
CS Sedan Ardennes players
Cypriot First Division players
Olympiakos Nicosia players
UD Los Barrios footballers
Malian expatriate footballers
Expatriate footballers in Cyprus
Expatriate footballers in Spain
Mali under-20 international footballers
Olympic footballers of Mali
Footballers at the 2004 Summer Olympics
Association football forwards
Footballers from Val-de-Marne